Jean-Paul Mpila (born 29 November 1960) is a Congolese football manager.

Managerial career
Mpila has managed Kotoko de Mfoa, Patronage Sainte-Anne (two stints), Étoile du Congo, CARA Brazzaville, Club 57 Tourbillon, the Congo women's national football team, Saint Michel d'Ouenzé and the Equatorial Guinea women's national football team at the 2010 Summer Youth Olympics and two Africa Women Cup of Nations editions (2010 and 2018).

In May 2022, Mpila went to Paris, France with his lawyer to denounce the Equatoguinean Football Federation to FIFA for breach of his contract as manager of the women's national team.

References

1960 births
Living people
Sportspeople from Brazzaville
Republic of the Congo football managers
Women's association football managers
Equatorial Guinea women's national football team managers
Republic of the Congo expatriate sportspeople
Expatriate football managers in Equatorial Guinea